

Introduction 
A Syracuse dish or Syracuse watch glass is a shallow, circular, flat-bottomed dish of thick glass. Usually, it is 67 mm in outer diameter and 52 mm in inner diameter.

Background 
Nathan Cobb, one of the pioneers of nematology in the United States,was the first who suggested using the Syracuse Dish for counting nematodes in 1918.

Uses 
It is used as laboratory equipment in biology for either storage or culturing.

References 

Laboratory glassware
Microbiology equipment